Reggie Bell (4 September 1904 – 13 October 1988) was a British middle-distance runner. He competed in the men's 1500 metres at the 1928 Summer Olympics.

References

1904 births
1988 deaths
Athletes (track and field) at the 1928 Summer Olympics
British male middle-distance runners
Olympic athletes of Great Britain
Place of birth missing